The 1934–35 season was Newport County's third consecutive season in the Third Division South and their 14th in the Football League. The season started with three straight wins and the club found itself top of the table after the first match. However, with 18 defeats in the last half of the season County were forced into the re-election process for the fourth time, but were comfortably re-elected.

Season review

Results summary

Results by round

Fixtures and results

Third Division South

FA Cup

Third Division South Cup

Welsh Cup

League table

Election

External links
 Newport County 1934-1935 : Results
 Newport County football club match record: 1935
 Welsh Cup 1934/35

References

 Amber in the Blood: A History of Newport County. 

1934-35
English football clubs 1934–35 season
1934–35 in Welsh football